Dene Simpson (born 24 August 1956) is a South African sprint canoer who competed in the early 1990s. At the 1992 Summer Olympics in Barcelona, she was eliminated in the semifinals of both the K-1 500 m and the K-2 500 m event.

References
Sports-Reference.com profile

1956 births
Canoeists at the 1992 Summer Olympics
Living people
Olympic canoeists of South Africa
South African female canoeists